Caroleen is an unincorporated community and census-designated place (CDP) in southeastern Rutherford County, North Carolina, United States. Its population was 652 as of the 2010 census. Caroleen has a post office with ZIP code 28019. U.S. Route 221 Alternate passes through the community.

Demographics

History 
Caroleen is located on the Second Broad River. It was named in honor of Caroline, wife of industrialist Simpson B. Tanner Sr.

The Post Office Department ruled that Caroline was too similar to Carolina to be acceptable, so the name Caroleen was selected instead.

The communities of Avondale and Henrietta, founded in 1887 and named for Tanner's mother-in-law Henrietta McRae Spencer, lie directly south.

Notable person
Smoky Burgess – Major League Baseball player, 9-time All-Star and 1960 World Series champion

References

Census-designated places in North Carolina
Census-designated places in Rutherford County, North Carolina
Unincorporated communities in North Carolina
Unincorporated communities in Rutherford County, North Carolina